Sculptiferussacia is a genus of small air-breathing land snails, terrestrial pulmonate gastropod mollusks in the family Ferussaciidae.

Species
The genus Sculptiferrussacia includes the following species:
 Sculptiferussacia clausiliaeformis Alonso & Ibáñez, 1992

References

Ferussaciidae
Taxonomy articles created by Polbot